Athyrma is a genus of moths in the family Erebidae.

Species
 Athyrma adjutrix Cramer, [1780]
 Athyrma antica Schaus 1912
 Athyrma anuliplaga Walker 1865
 Athyrma cordigera Walker 1869
 Athyrma cunesema Hampson 1926
 Athyrma discimacula Hampson 1926
 Athyrma ganglio Hübner, [1831]
 Athyrma misera Butler 1879
 Athyrma nodosa Moschler 1880
 Athyrma orbana Moschler 1880
 Athyrma perficiens (Walker 1858)
 Athyrma resecta (Dognin 1912)
 Athyrma saalmulleri Mabille 1881
 Athyrma triangulifera Draudt 1950
 Athyrma tuberosa Felder & Rogenhofer 1874

Former species
Athyrma discolor Fabricius, 1794
Athyrma eupepla Prout 1924
Athyrma heterographa (Hampson 1912)
Athyrma javanica Roepke 1941
Athyrma mixosema Prout 1928
Athyrma novoguineana Bethune-Baker, 1906
Athyrma paucimacula Roepke 1941
Athyrma pratti (Bethune-Baker 1906)
Athyrma ptocha Prout 1925
Athyrma rufiscripta Hampson 1926
Athyrma rhynchophora Prout 1924
Athyrma spilota Joicey & Talbot 1917
Athyrma subpunctata Bethune-Baker, 1906
Athyrma subumbra Bethune-Baker, 1906
Athyrma uloptera Prout 1925

References
 Athyrma at Markku Savela's Lepidoptera and Some Other Life Forms
 Natural History Museum Lepidoptera genus database

Eulepidotinae
Moth genera